André Boulloche (7 September 1915 – 16 March 1978) was a French politician who belonged to the Socialist Party.

Biography

Family

Decorations

References 

1915 births
1978 deaths
Politicians from Paris
Politicians of the French Fifth Republic
French Resistance members
École Polytechnique alumni
French Ministers of National Education
Socialist Party (France) politicians